Growden may refer to:

Grace Growden Galloway (1727–1782), wife of loyalist Joseph Galloway
Greg Growden (c.1960–2020), Australian sports journalist
Growden Memorial Park, park in Fairbanks, Alaska, United States